Kariz-e Zaman-e Bala is a village in Badghis Province in north western Afghanistan.

References

External links 
Satellite map at Maplandia.com 

Populated places in Badghis Province